FMX may stand for:

FMX (broadcasting), a system employing audio noise reduction
FMX (Conference), an annual conference on visual effects in Stuttgart, taking place in February
Famoxadone, a pesticide abbreviated as FMX
FireMonkey, a visual software development framework abbreviated as FMX
Ford FMX Transmission, an automatic transmission
Freestyle Motocross, a variation on the sport of motocross in which motorcycle riders attempt to impress judges with jumps and stunts
Full Mouth X-ray
Fomento Económico Mexicano, a Mexican beverage and retail company